Leah Hager Cohen is an American author who writes both fiction and nonfiction.

Cohen's father was superintendent of the Lexington School for the Deaf in Queens, New York, and she became fluent in sign language there. She entered NYU at age 16, intending to study drama, but later transferred to Hampshire College to study literature, graduating in 1988. After working as a sign language interpreter for two years, she entered Columbia Journalism School, graduating in 1991. Her first book grew out of her masters thesis, in which she reported on deaf culture.

Cohen lives in Belmont, Massachusetts.

Bibliography

Fiction
 Heat Lightning (Avon, 1997)
 Heart, You Bully, You Punk (Viking, 2003)
 House Lights (W. W. Norton & Company, 2007)
 The Grief of Others (Riverhead, 2011)
 No Book but the World (Riverhead, 2014)
 Strangers and Cousins (Riverhead, 2019)

Non-Fiction
 Train Go Sorry: Inside a Deaf World (Houghton Mifflin, 1994)
 Glass, Paper, Beans: Revelations on the Nature and Value of Ordinary Things (Doubleday, 1997)
 The Stuff of Dreams: Behind the Curtain of an American Community Theater (Viking, 2001)
 Without Apology: Girls, Women, and the Desire to Fight (Random House, 2005)
 I Don't Know: In Praise of Admitting Ignorance (Except When You Shouldn't) (Riverhead, 2013)

External links
LeahHagerCohen.com
Love As A Found Object (Blog)
Boston Globe article on Leah Hager Cohen

American women writers
Columbia University Graduate School of Journalism alumni
Living people
Hampshire College alumni
New York University alumni
Year of birth missing (living people)
21st-century American women